Clube Esportivo Lajeadense, commonly referred to as Lajeadense, is a Brazilian football club based in Lajeado, Rio Grande do Sul. It currently plays in Campeonato Gaúcho Série A2, the second level of the Rio Grande do Sul state football league.

History
The club was founded on April 4, 1911. They won the Campeonato Gaúcho Second Division in 1959 and in 1979.

Achievements
 Copa FGF
 Winners (1): 2015

Recopa Gaúcha
 Winners (1): 2015

 Super Copa Gaúcha
 Winners (1): 2014

Campeonato Gaúcho Série A2
 Winners (2): 1959, 1979

Stadium
Clube Esportivo Lajeadense play their home games at Arena Alviazul. The stadium has a maximum capacity of 7,500 people.

References

External links
 Official website

 
Association football clubs established in 1911
Football clubs in Rio Grande do Sul
1911 establishments in Brazil